Baalaraajana Kathe (Kannada: ಬಾಲರಾಜನ ಕಥೆ) is a 1965 Indian Kannada film, directed by Venunath. The film stars Kalyan Kumar, G. V. Lathadevi, Narasimharaju and Udaykumar in the lead roles. The film has musical score by S. Hanumantha Rao.

Cast
Kalyan Kumar
G. V. Lathadevi
Narasimharaju
Udaykumar
B. Jayamma

References

1960s Kannada-language films